Vajranga is an asura in Hinduism. According to the Puranas, he was born to Diti and was fathered by the sage Kashyapa. Diti, being the mother of the asuras, sought revenge for the deaths of her children by the hands of the devas. Diti is said to have undergone severe austerities for ten thousand years in exchange for a boon which granted her a child who would slay the devas. Kashyapa granted her wish and they birthed Vajranaka, whose body was like Indra's weapon, the vajra.

Vajranka is the father of the asura Tārakāsura, who continued upon his father's war with the devas, but was ultimately vanquished by the war god, Kartikeya.

Etymology 
Vajranga is an adjective meaning "studded with diamonds".

Vajranga is a Sanskrit compound consisting of the terms vajra, meaning thunderbolt or diamond, and aṅka (अङ्क) meaning adorned.

Alternatively, the name Vajranaga, derived from vajra and nāga, means diamond serpent. In Vedic Hinduism, asuras such as Vritra are sometimes depicted as serpentine.

References 

Daityas

Asura
Hindu mythology